Agito may refer to:

In arts and entertainment

Characters
Kamen Rider Agito (character), the titular character in the Kamen Rider Agito tokusatsu TV series
Another Agito, a character in the 2001 Kamen Rider Series Kamen Rider Agito
Agito, a character in the movie Kamen Rider J
Wanijima Agito, a character in the Air Gear anime and manga series
Agito, the main character in the Origin: Spirits of the Past anime series
Agito (Nanoha), a character in the Magical Girl Lyrical Nanoha Strikers anime series

Other uses in arts and entertainment
Kamen Rider Agito, a 2001-2002 TV series in the Kamen Rider franchise
Final Fantasy Agito XIII, the original title of the 2011 PSP video game Final Fantasy Type-0
Final Fantasy Agito, the mobile device prequel to Final Fantasy Type-0

Other uses
Agito (symbol) (meaning "I move" in Latin), a symbol used by the International Paralympic Committee
Agitavit Solutions, an information technology company from Slovenia, formerly Agito